The Golden Pen of Freedom Award is an annual international journalism award established in 1961, given by the World Association of Newspapers to individuals or organisations. The stated purpose of the award is "to recognise the outstanding action, in writing or deed, of an individual, a group or an institution in the cause of press freedom". One of the objectives of the award is "to turn the spotlight of public attention on repressive governments and journalists who fight them" and to afford journalists a degree of protection against further persecution.

The Award is presented each year at the opening ceremony of the World Newspaper Congress and World Editors Forum.

Award winners

See also 

 William O. Douglas Prize

References

External links 
 Golden Pen of Freedom Award

Journalism awards
Free expression awards
Literary awards honouring human rights
Awards established in 1961